USMB may stand for:

 Université Savoie-Mont Blanc, a French university.
 Union Sportive de la Médina de Blida, an Algerian football team
 United States. Conference of Mennonite Brethren Churches, a United States association of churches
 United States Metric Board, a United States government agency set up to encourage metrication